Liu Songsheng (1916 – 1 January 2000) was a Chinese footballer. He competed in the men's tournament at the 1948 Summer Olympics.

References

External links
 
 

1916 births
2000 deaths
Chinese footballers
China international footballers
Olympic footballers of China
Footballers at the 1948 Summer Olympics
Place of birth missing
Association football midfielders